In geometry, the Thomson cubic of a triangle is the locus of centers of circumconics whose normals at the vertices are concurrent.

See also
 Cubic plane curve – Thomson cubic

References

 Viktor Vasilʹevich Prasolov: Essays on numbers and figures. AMS, 2000, ISBN 9780821819449, p. 73

External links
 K002 (Thomson cubic) at Cubics in the Triangle Plane

Curves defined for a triangle